Shirayeh may refer to:
 Shirayeh, Rasht
 Shirayeh, Rudsar